Dennis vanEngelsdorp is an associate professor of entomology at the University of Maryland, College Park. He is the Chief Scientist for the Bee Informed Partnership and has been involved in a number of studies aimed at understanding colony collapse disorder. VanEngelsdorp was formerly the chief apiarist for Pennsylvania. His was married to H. G. Carrillo, a professor of English at George Washington University, until Carrillo's death of COVID-19 in April 2020.

Education 

2011 - Doctorate of Philosophy.  The Pennsylvania State University, University Park, PA, USA
1995 - Master of Science in Environmental Biology. University of Guelph, Guelph, Ontario, Canada
1992 - Bachelor of Science in Agriculture.  University of Guelph, Guelph, Ontario, Canada

Awards 

 2010 Roger A. Morse Outstanding teaching/Extension Service/Regulatory Award
 2009 Fine Fellowship Scholarship for Gigapixel Imagery for Science Outreach

References

American beekeepers
American entomologists
University of Maryland, College Park faculty
University of Guelph alumni
Pennsylvania State University alumni
Year of birth missing (living people)
Living people